Ojo de Agua Dam is a dam located southeast of the town of El Tepehuaje de Morelos, Jalisco, Mexico. It is the apparently largest dam in the municipality of San Martín de Hidalgo.

References

Dams in Mexico